Steinia is a genus of lichen-forming fungi in the family Aphanopsidaceae. It has three species.

Species
Steinia australis 
Steinia geophana 
Steinia luridescens

References

Ascomycota genera
Lichen genera
Taxa described in 1873
Taxa named by Gustav Wilhelm Körber